Hippy Sippy was a candy introduced in the late 1960s.  It derived its name from its packaging: small, multi-colored pellets contained in a toy package ampoule (sometimes incorrectly identified as a syringe).  The intent was to mimick drug usage in the hippie culture, primarily through the toy ampoule being a reminder of heroin and secondarily through the multi-colored candy being a reminder of uppers and downers.  Included was a button with the phrase "Hippy Sippy says I'll try anything" and "please feed me" printed on it.

Hippy Sippy was immediately controversial and outraged many people because it normalized drug use. It was promptly removed from the market but is still remembered due to its cultural shock value. 

More recently, the name was adopted by saxophonist Hank Mobley for his song "Hippy Sippy Blues."

See also
Candy cigarette
Bubble pipe
 List of confectionery brands

References

1960s toys
Drug culture
Brand name confectionery